Zalieutes is a fish genus in the family Ogcocephalidae.

Species
There are currently two recognized species in this genus:
 Zalieutes elater D. S. Jordan & C. H. Gilbert, 1882 (Roundel batfish)
 Zalieutes mcgintyi Fowler, 1952 (Tricorn batfish)

References

Ogcocephalidae
Marine fish genera
Taxa named by David Starr Jordan
Taxa named by Barton Warren Evermann